Amphisbaena brevis is a species of worm lizards endemic to Brazil.

References

brevis
Endemic fauna of Brazil
Reptiles of Brazil
Reptiles described in 2009
Taxa named by Christine Strüssman
Taxa named by Tami Mott